The Federal Judicial Academy is an agency for legal training run by Government of Pakistan in Islamabad. The Academy was established in 1988 and acts under Federal Judicial Academy Act, 1997. The academy offers training for Judicial Officers (Judges and Magistrates) and court personnel.

Management 
Affairs of the academy are supervised by a Board of Governors, which is headed by Chief Justice of Pakistan, other members are Chief Justices of high courts, Minister and Secretary of Law and Justice Ministry, Attorney General of Pakistan and an appointed Director-General. The Director-General Looks after day-to-day affairs.

See also 
 Supreme Court of Pakistan
 Khyber Pakhtunkhwa Judicial Academy
 Punjab Judicial Academy
 Balochistan Judicial Academy
 Sindh Judicial Academy
 Gilgit-Baltistan Judicial Academy

References

External links 
 Federal Judicial Academy
 Supreme Court of Pakistan

Judiciary of Pakistan
Pakistan federal departments and agencies
1988 establishments in Pakistan
Legal organizations based in Pakistan